Raymond Arthur Charles Davies is a male former athlete who competed for England.

Athletics career
He represented England in the javelin at the 1958 British Empire and Commonwealth Games in Cardiff, Wales.

He was a member of the London University Athletic Club.

References

English male javelin throwers
Athletes (track and field) at the 1958 British Empire and Commonwealth Games
Commonwealth Games competitors for England